In mathematics, a base-orderable matroid is a matroid that has the following additional property, related to the bases of the matroid.

The property in context 
Base-orderability imposes two requirements on the function :

 It should be a bijection;
 For every , both  and  should be bases.

Each of these properties alone is easy to satisfy:

 All bases of a given matroid have the same cardinality, so there are n! bijections between them (where n is the common size of the bases). But it is not guaranteed that one of these bijections satisfies property 2.
However, it is not guaranteed that the resulting function f be a bijection - it is possible that several  are matched to the same .

Matroids that are base-orderable 
Every partition matroid is strongly base-orderable. A basis of this matroid is a set which contains exactly  elements of each category .

Every transversal matroid is strongly base-orderable.

Matroids that are not base-orderable 
Some matroids are not base-orderable. A notable example is the graphic matroid on the graph K4, i.e., the matroid whose bases are the spanning trees of the clique on 4 vertices. Denote the vertices of K4 by 1,2,3,4, and its edges by 12,13,14,23,24,34.  Note that the bases are:   

 {12,13,14}, {12,13,24}, {12,13,34};  {12,14,23}, {12,14,34};  {12,23,24}, {12,23,34}; {12,24,34};  
 {13,14,23}, {13,14,24};  {13,23,24}, {13,23,34};  {13,24,34};   
 {14,23,24}, {14,23,34};  {14,24,34}.  
Consider the two bases A = {12,23,34} and B = {13,14,24}, and suppose that there is a function f satisfying the exchange property (property 2 above). Then:

 f(12) must equal 14: it cannot be 24, since A \ {12} + {24} = {23,24,34} which is not a basis; it cannot be 13, since B \ {13} + {12} = {12,14,24} which is not a basis.
 f(34) must equal 14: it cannot be 24, since B \ {24} + {34} = {13,14,34} which is not a basis; it cannot be 13, since A \ {34} + {13} = {12,13,23} which is not a basis.

Then f is not a bijection - it maps two elements of A to the same element of B.

There are matroids that are base-orderable but not strongly-base-orderable.

Properties 
In base-orderable matroids, a feasible exchange bijection exists not only between bases but also between any two independent sets of the same cardinality, i.e., any two independent sets  and  such that . 

This can be proved by induction on the difference between the size of the sets and the size of a basis (recall that all bases of a matroid have the same size). If the difference is 0 then the sets are actually bases, and the property follows from the definition of base-orderable matroids. Otherwise by the augmentation property of a matroid, we can augment  to an independent set  and augment  to an independent set .

Completeness 
The class of base-orderable matroids is complete. This means that it is closed under the operations of minors, duals, direct sums, truncations, and induction by directed graphs.  It is also closed under restriction, union and truncation.

The same is true for the class of strongly-base-orderable matroids.

References 

Matroid theory